Neyzar Rural District is a rural district (dehestan) in Salafchegan District, Qom County, Qom Province, Iran. At the 2006 census, its population was 4,155, in 1,150 families.  The rural district has 18 villages.

References 

Rural Districts of Qom Province
Qom County